Edward Meyer Kern (October 26, 1822 or 1823 – November 25, 1863) was an American artist, topographer, and explorer of California, the Southwestern United States, and East Asia. He is the namesake of the Kern River and Kern County, California.

Early life

Kern was born in Philadelphia, the son of John Kern III and Mary Elizabeth Bignell. He was trained as an artist. His brother Richard Kern (1821–1853) was also an accomplished artist, and his brother Benjamin Kern (1818–1849) was a doctor. They joined him on several expeditions.

Expeditions

California

In 1845–46, Kern accompanied explorer Captain John C. Frémont on his Third Expedition into Mexican Alta California. Kern received a daily salary of $3.00. He served as a cartographer as well as a documentation artist, collecting botanical and animal specimens on the journey. Each night of the trip Kern drew a field map of the day's route with longitudes and latitudes, and sketched landmarks.

Just before they reached Klamath Lake, Klamath tribesmen attacked the expedition and several members were killed. A brutal counterattack by Frémont and his group upon a native village resulted in the deaths of many Klamath people. Kern recorded the counterattack in an engraving that was later published with Frémont's report.

Frémont then ordered his main party – which included Kern and Joseph Walker – to travel the southern Sierra route over the pass Walker had discovered a decade earlier, while Frémont and a few others crossed the northern Sierra at Donner Pass. Frémont named the pass through which Walker led the party Walker Pass. Kern mapped the Kern River, which at the time was known as the Rio de San Felipe, as named by the Spanish. Later, Frémont named the river after his artist. Kern’s campsite in the Kern River Valley, at the junction of the South and North Forks of the Kern River, now lies submerged by Lake Isabella. A historical monument for Kern’s site was placed above the reservoir near its eastern shore on Highway 178.

During the 1846 Bear Flag Revolt against Mexico, Frémont placed the 23-year-old Kern in command of Sutter's Fort and its company of dragoons in the Sacramento Valley. That left John Sutter the assignment as lieutenant of the dragoons, and second-in-command of his own fort, until 1847.

While in command there, news of the stranded Donner Party reached Kern, as Sutter's Fort had been their destination. Kern vaguely promised the federal government would do something for a rescue party across the Sierra, but had no authority to pay anyone. He was later criticized for his mismanagement delaying the search.

In February 1847, Kern's forces were requested by several settlers who wished to intimidate Indians who had been involved in raids. Kern brought in 20 men, joined by 30 more led by John Sutter, and then proceeded with a series of attacks that killed 20 California Indians in what became known as the Kern and Sutter massacres.

Southwest

In 1848−1849, Edward Kern and his brothers Richard and Benjamin joined Frémont's Fourth Expedition, to the Rocky Mountains in present-day southern Colorado and northern New Mexico. By the time the last surviving member of the expedition reached Taos on February 12, 1849, 10 of the party had died. To move more quickly to safety, it had been necessary for the brothers to hide their goods (including sketches) in a cave. After arriving in the New Mexico Territory, Benjamin Kern and Frémont's guide Old Bill Williams returned for the hidden goods but were killed by a band of Utes.

In August 1849, Edward and Richard Kern joined the John M. Washington military reconnaissance expedition to the Navajo in 1849, to punish the Navajo for raids on the New Mexico settlements and to secure a treaty with them, in addition to surveying the country. The expedition brought both brothers back to New Mexico. Richard's role, as second assistant and artist, was to make portraits of Indian chiefs, costume, scenery, geological formations, ruins, and to copy ancient writings found on stones. Edward's role was as first assistant and topographer.

Edward and Richard stayed in New Mexico for two years, working for the Corps of Topographical Engineers. The Kern brothers gave the American public some of its earliest authentic images of the people and landscape of Arizona, New Mexico, and southern Colorado, with views of Canyon de Chelly, Chaco Canyon, and El Morro (Inscription Rock).

In 1853, Edward joined Lieutenant John Pope, who was seeking a better route between Santa Fe and Fort Leavenworth. His brother Richard was killed in 1853, while on the Gunnison–Beckwith Expedition to survey a railroad route that would pass through the Rocky Mountains.

Asia
From 1853 to 1855, Edward Kern served on the ship USS Vincennes on an expedition to East Asia. The captain, Cadwalader Ringgold, was declared insane when they reached Hong Kong. Kern used both photography and drawing during this trip. The expedition landed on the eastern shores of Siberia, where Kern spent several weeks. They returned home via Tahiti and San Francisco.

In 1858, Kern joined Lieutenant John Mercer Brooke on a survey of the sea lanes between California and China, returning in 1860.

Civil War

During the American Civil War, Kern served under Frémont, who had command of the Army of the West, but when Frémont was relieved of command, Kern was as well.

Personal life

Kern suffered from epilepsy beginning at a young age. Late in life he established a studio in Philadelphia. Edward Kern died in November 1863 of an epileptic seizure, at his home on 1305 Chestnut Street in Philadelphia. He was buried in Glenwood Cemetery, and later re-interred in New Glenwood Cemetery.

Legacy

Kern's diaries were discovered under the floorboards in an old hotel in Delaware Water Gap, Pennsylvania, and provided source material for David Weber's book on his brother, Richard Kern. The diary and papers are now in the Beinecke Rare Book and Manuscript Library at Yale University.

The Boston Museum of Fine Arts holds more than eighty of Kern's works. The Kern River and Kern County, both in California, were named for him.

California Historical Landmark

At the Entrance to Old IsabelIa Rd Recreation Area, at Lake Isabella is a marker, Edward Kern Campsite, noting Captain John C. Frémont's third expedition campsite with Edward M. Kern. Old IsabelIa Rd Recreation Area, is on California State Route 178 on the south side of the lake.

California Historical Landmark reads:
NO. 742 CAMPSITE OF EDWARD M. KERN - Near this spot at the confluence of the north and south forks of the Kern River, the Theodore Talbot party of Captain John C. Frémont's third expedition to the West camped for several weeks during December 1845 and January 1846. Frémont named the river in honor of Edward M. Kern, topographer for the expedition - Kern County was established in 1866.

See also
 California Historical Landmarks in Kern County
California Historical Landmark

References

Bibliography

 Edward Kern and American Expansion, by Robert V. Hine, Yale University Press, 1962
 In the Shadow of Fremont: Edward Kern and the Art of American Exploration, 1845-1860, by Robert V. Hine, University of Oklahoma Press, 1982.
 Indian Customs of California (Mar., 1853), in Archive of Aboriginal Knowledge, by Henry H. Schoolcraft (Philadelphia, 1865)
 Journal of an Exploration of the Mary's or Humboldt River, Carson Lake, and Owens River and Lake, in 1845, Appendix Q, in Report of Explorations across the Territory of Utah in 1859, by J. H. Simpson (Washington, DC, 1859)
 "Searching for New Sources in Western History"

External links
 Siskiyous.edu: Expedition Artists of the Frémont Expeditions: The Mid-1840s
 Academy of Natural Sciences, Ewell Sale Stewart Library: "Kern Drawings of the American Southwest" — gallery of 75 images.

American cartographers
American landscape painters
Explorers of California
Explorers of the United States
1820s births
1863 deaths
Artists of the American West
American people of the Bear Flag Revolt
Artists from Philadelphia
Burials at Glenwood Cemetery/Glenwood Memorial Gardens
People of the New Mexico Territory
People of the American Old West
Deaths from epilepsy
Neurological disease deaths in Pennsylvania
History of Kern County, California
E K
19th-century American painters
American male painters
19th-century American photographers
19th-century American male artists
Commanders of the California Republic